Amanda Mthandi (born 23 May 1996) is a South African soccer player who plays as a forward for University of Johannesburg and the South Africa women's national team.

International goals
Scores and results list South Africa's goal tally first

References

External links

1996 births
Living people
South African women's soccer players
Women's association football forwards
South Africa women's international soccer players
2019 FIFA Women's World Cup players
LGBT association football players
South African LGBT sportspeople
21st-century LGBT people